Gabriel Paul Joseph Dumont (born October 6, 1990) is a Canadian professional ice hockey forward who is currently playing for the Syracuse Crunch of the American Hockey League (AHL). Dumont was selected 139th overall in the fifth round of the 2009 NHL Entry Draft by the Montreal Canadiens.

Playing career
As a youth, Dumont played in the 2003 and 2004 Quebec International Pee-Wee Hockey Tournaments with minor ice hockey team sfrom Rimouski.

Dumont played four seasons with the Drummondville Voltigeurs in the Quebec Major Junior Hockey League before he was signed to a three-year, entry-level contract with the Montreal Canadiens on April 30, 2010. He recorded his first career NHL point on March 13, 2013, against the Ottawa Senators and scored his first NHL goal on April 17, 2013 against the Pittsburgh Penguins.

At the conclusion of his entry-level deal, in July 2013, Dumont was re-signed by the Canadiens to a two-year, two-way contract. This was followed by an additional one-year, two-way contract extension on June 1, 2015.

After 7 seasons within the Canadiens organization, Dumont left as a free agent to sign a one-year, two-way contract with the Tampa Bay Lightning on July 1, 2016. 

On June 28, 2017, the Lightning announced that it had re-signed Dumont to a two-year, $1.3 million contract extension. Dumont made the Lightning's roster to open the 2017–18 season. He appeared in 7 scoreless games before he was placed on waivers by the Lightning and claimed by the Ottawa Senators on November 22, 2017. On February 20, 2018, Dumont was placed on waivers by the Senators, and was then claimed by the Lightning the next day.

On July 1, 2019, Dumont signed as a free agent to a two-year, two-way contract with the Minnesota Wild. 

At the conclusion of his contract with the Wild, Dumont as a free agent returned to his former club, the Tampa Bay Lightning, in agreeing to a one-year, two-way contract on July 28, 2021.

On June 9, 2022, Dumont signed a two-year contract with the Syracuse Crunch to remain with the Crunch and within the Lightning organization.

Career statistics

Awards and honours

References

External links

 

1990 births
Living people
Canadian ice hockey right wingers
Drummondville Voltigeurs players
Hamilton Bulldogs (AHL) players
Ice hockey people from Quebec
Iowa Wild players
Minnesota Wild players
Montreal Canadiens draft picks
Montreal Canadiens players
Ottawa Senators players
People from Bas-Saint-Laurent
St. John's IceCaps players
Syracuse Crunch players
Tampa Bay Lightning players